The Roman Catholic Diocese of Rancagua (in Latin: Dioecesis Rancaguensis) is a suffragan diocese of the Archdiocese of Santiago de Chile. The diocese was established on 18 October 1925 as Diócesis de Santa Cruz de Rancagua, by Pope Pius XII by means of the papal bull  Apostolici muneris ratio.

The diocese is headed by Guillermo Patricio Vera Soto, who was named Bishop by Pope Francis on 8 June 2021.

Diocesan statistics
The diocese comprises the three provinces of the O'Higgins Region of Chile: Cachapoal, Colchagua and  Cardenal Caro, with the exception of the comuna of Navidad, of the latter province, which belongs to the diocese of Melipilla. It is estimated that 80 percent of the population of the diocese is Catholic. This figure represents about 625,000 Catholics out of a total population of 781,000 persons.

The diocesan cathedral is located in the city of Rancagua.

Bishops

Bishops of Rancagua

Coadjutor bishop
Alejandro Goić Karmelić (2003–2004)

Auxiliary bishops
Raul Silva Silva (1963–1994)
Jorge Arturo Augustin Medina Estévez (1984–1987), appointed Bishop here; future Cardinal
Luis Gleisner Wobbe (1991–2001), appointed Auxiliary Bishop of La Serena

Other priests of this diocese who became bishops
Francisco de Borja Valenzuela Ríos, appointed Apostolic Administrator of Copiapó in 1955; appointed Prelate of Copiapó in 1956
Orozimbo Fuenzalida y Fuenzalida, appointed Prelate of Calama in 1968
Miguel Caviedes Medina, appointed Bishop of Osorno in 1982

External links
Website of the diocese 
Diocese of Rancagua at Catholic-Hierarchy.org

Rancagua
Christian organizations established in 1925
Roman Catholic dioceses and prelatures established in the 20th century
Rancagua, Roman Catholic Diocese of
1925 establishments in Chile